The Bibulman (Pibelmen)  are an Aboriginal Australian people of the southwestern region of Western Australia, a subgroup of the Noongar.

Name
Their autonym may be related to the word for stingray, pibilum.

Country
They were concentrated around the Lower Blackwood River and the hills between the Blackwood and the Warren River. Their eastern flank ran to Gardner River and Broke Inlet. The Scott River was also a part of their territory. Their inland extension ran to Manjimup and Bridgetown.

Alternative names
 Pepelman, Peopleman, Piblemen
 Bibulman, Bibulmun, Bibudmoun, Bibbulmun, Bebleman
 Bibilum
 Meeraman (Koreng exonym)
 Murram (Menang exonym)
 Bajongwongi (language name)

Some words
 mammon  (father)
 nungun (mother)
 jangar (white man)
 dwardar (tame dog)
 yakine (wild dog)
 yonger  (kangaroo)
 wager (emu)

Notes

Citations

Sources

Great Southern (Western Australia)
Noongar